Fannizadeh is an Iranian surname. Notable people with the surname include:

Donya Fannizadeh (1967–2016), Iranian puppeteer
Parviz Fannizadeh (1938–1980), Iranian actor and television star

Surnames of Iranian origin